is a Japanese manga series written and illustrated by Tatsuya Egawa. It was published in Shogakukan's Big Comic Spirits from 1992 to 2001, its chapters were collected in 34 tankōbon volumes. The story follows, high schooler Naoki Murakami who asks Haruka Mizuno to date him. They date while both worry about their upcoming university entrance examinations.

As of January 2004, Tokyo Daigaku Monogatari had over 20 million copies in circulation, making it one of the best-selling manga series.

Plot
Naoki Murakami, a third-year student at Hakodate Koyo High School, is a man who has the triple threat of good looks, a sharp mind, and outstanding motor nerves. One day, Murakami is taken by his friend, Sano, to see the women's tennis club match at his high school. Murakami fell in love at first sight with Haruka Mizuno, who was playing a match at that time, and the next day he applied for a date, and the relationship started.

Media

Manga
Written and illustrated by Tatsuya Egawa, Tokyo Daigaku Monogatari was serialized in Shogakukan's seinen manga magazine from 1992 to 2001. Shogakukan collected its chapters in thirty-four tankōbon volumes, released from July 30, 1993, to February 28, 2001.

Live-action film
A live-action film of the same name directed by Tatsuya Egawa and based on his manga was released in February 2006. The screenplay was written by Kotoe Nagata, and the film, produced by the Soft On Demand studio, starred Yoko Mitsuya, Kei Tanaka, Kazuki Namioka, Sasa Handa, Fujiko, Naoko Watanabe and Takeshi Masu.

Reception
As of January 2004, Tokyo Daigaku Monogatari had over 20 million copies in circulation.

References

External links
 
 

1992 manga
1994 Japanese television series debuts
2004 anime OVAs
2006 films
Live-action films based on manga
2000s Japanese-language films
Japanese drama television series
Seinen manga
Shogakukan franchises
Shogakukan manga
Tatsuya Egawa
TV Asahi original programming